Kyle Angela Negrito (born December 15, 1996) is a Filipino volleyball player. She currently plays for Creamline Cool Smashers in the Premier Volleyball League.

Volleyball career

UAAP 
Negrito was a member of FEU Lady Tamaraws collegiate women's University and she plays Setter for the team.

In 2019, Negrito make her final year in the UAAP and plays for Creamline Cool Smashers as she turns pro.

PVL 
In 2018, Negrito joined Tacloban Fighting Warays in the Premier Volleyball League.

In 2019, Negrito was sign by the Creamline Cool Smashers.

Clubs 
  Chery Tiggo Crossovers - (2017)
Tacloban Fighting Warays - (2018)
  Creamline Cool Smashers - (2018 - present)
  Philippine National team - (2022 - present)

Awards

Collegiate

Clubs

References 

Filipino women's volleyball players
1996 births
Living people
Far Eastern University alumni
Setters (volleyball)